Die! Die! Die! is the debut studio album by New Zealand punk rock band Die! Die! Die!.

It was recorded and mixed in Chicago at Electrical Audio by Steve Albini between 21 and 24 March 2005. It was mastered by Steve Rooke at Abbey Road Studios on 16 June 2005.

It was released on 22 January 2006 on OK!Relax / Inertia Distribution in Australia and by Capital Recordings in New Zealand.

The album was released in the UK in 2007 by Pet Piranha Records with 4 extra tracks, taken from the Locust Weeks EP.

Track listing
 "Like 48th St, Maybe?" – 1:02
 "Disappear Here" – 1:45
 "Franz (17 Die! Die! Die! Fans Can't Be Wrong)" – 1:39
 "Auckland Is Burning" – 3:14
 "Everybody's Got Something to Hide Except For Me and My Mikey" – 3:00
 "Ashtray! Ashtray!" – 2:49
 "Year Nine, Yeah!" – 2:19
 "L.A Bones" – 1:19
 "Shyness Will Get You Nowhere" – 2:15
 "'Out of the Blue'" – 2:29

2005 debut albums
Die! Die! Die! albums
albums produced by Steve Albini